Limnaecia loxoscia is a moth of the family Cosmopterigidae. It is known from Australia, where it has been recorded from New South Wales.

References

Limnaecia
Moths described in 1923
Moths of Australia